Alain Richard (4 October 1924 – 24 June 2021) was a French Franciscan monk. He was a part of Peace Brigades International and organized .

Biography
Richard graduated from university with a degree in agricultural engineering. He entered the Franciscan novitiate in 1947 and took his vows in 1953. He then served as a vicar in Orsay and was chaplain of Paris-Sud University until 1967.

In 1973, Richard began living in the United States. He participated in his first Peace Brigades International in 1983 and subsequently the Pace e Bene in 1989. He returned to France in 1998 and joined the Franciscan community in Toulouse. He helped organize a cercle de silence in 2007.

Alain Richard died on 24 June 2021 at the age of 95.

Bibliography
Piliers pour une culture de la non-violence (2001)
Une vie dans le refus de la violence, Alain Richard, entretiens avec Christophe Henning (2010)

References

1924 births
2021 deaths
French Franciscans
French monks
French engineers
French emigrants to the United States